Union Street Baptist Church is in Union Street, Crewe, Cheshire, England.  It is recorded in the National Heritage List for England as a designated Grade II listed building.  In addition to the church, the attached vestry, meeting rooms and offices, boundary wall and railing are included in the listing.

History

The church was built between 1882 and 1884 to a design by J. Wallis Chapman.  It was built to serve the railway workers in the town.

Architecture

Constructed in brick, the church has ashlar dressings and a tiled roof.  It contains features from many architectural styles, with Gothic predominating.  The church is rectangular in five-bays, with the vestry and meeting room at the east end forming a T-plan.  At the west end is a doorway with a pointed arch, flanked by single lancet windows.  Above these is a round window containing Decorated tracery.  To the right of this is a three-stage stair turret, surmounted by a timber-framed octagonal lantern.  To the left is another, lower, stair turret, the upper stage of which has continuous glazing under a hipped roof.  Along the sides, each bay contains two lancet windows with a flat-headed three-light window above.  Inside the church is a gallery on all sides carried on cast iron columns.  At the front of the church is a raised platform over a tiled baptistry.  All the windows contain patterned stained glass.  The two-manual pipe organ is housed in the gallery.  It was installed in 1922, and made by Ernest Wadsworth of Manchester.

See also

Listed buildings in Crewe

References

Grade II listed churches in Cheshire
Churches completed in 1884
Baptist churches in Cheshire